Billingsville is an unincorporated community in Union Township, Union County, in the U.S. state of Indiana.

History
A post office was established at Billingsville in 1833, and remained in operation until 1903. Billingsville School was a one-room school erected in Billingsville in 1870 and replaced by a two-story school that existed from 1926 to 1953. The community was named after the Billings family of settlers.

Geography

References

Unincorporated communities in Union County, Indiana
Unincorporated communities in Indiana